Richmond Railway may refer to:

 The Richmond Railway in south west London, England in 1846-1847, part of the Windsor lines of the London and South Western Railway
 Richmond railway line in Sydney, Australia from 1864
 Richmond Railway (Richmond, Virginia), USA, 1860 - 1881
 Richmond Union Passenger Railway, a street running trolley service in Richmond, Virginia, USA, 1888 - 1949